Casa Romantica, officially known as the Casa Romantica Cultural Center and Gardens, is a historic building and nonprofit organization located in San Clemente, California that provides cultural programs for people of all ages. The organization was founded in 2002 by a charter of the City of San Clemente and is located at the historic home of Ole Hanson, who co-founded the City of San Clemente. Casa Romantica is listed on the National Register of Historic Places listings in Orange County, California, on December 27, 1991.

Mission 

Casa Romantica Cultural Center and Gardens is a non-profit 501(c)3 organization and is the historic home of the founder of the City of San Clemente. Casa Romantica provides programs for all ages in arts, music, history, and horticulture and is a premier Southern California cultural center.

History

Construction of the Home
Ole Hanson, a real estate developer and one-time mayor of Seattle, visited San Clemente in the early 1920s and chose the site to create his ideal community, a "Spanish Village by the Sea." On December 6, 1925, Hanson persuaded people who had driven from Los Angeles and the surrounding areas for a free chicken dinner and a sales pitch to buy more than 300 lots in what then was a desolate landscape remote from the rest of southern California. Hanson and co-founder H.H. Cotton devised San Clemente as one of the first master-planned cities in California, with town boundaries consisting of roughly five miles of coastline by one mile from the shores to the inland hills.

In 1927, Hanson commissioned architect Carl Lindbom to design a home for his family that overlooked the Pacific Ocean. Lindbom, who also designed La Casa Pacifica (the former Western White House), realized the construction of Hanson's California Dream home: a seven-bedroom, seven-bath house that included the finest materials and innovations in construction at that time. The foundation for the home was built by Oscar Easley who did much of the street grading for San Clemente, and also established the Oscar Easley Block, which later became City Hall. 
The Hanson family brought exotic furnishings, plants, and animals to the home, with colorful fish that filled the courtyard pool and several horses for beach rides.

Ownership
Hanson's vision of a master-planned Spanish village prospered until the Great Depression destroyed the national economy. In 1934, the Bank of America foreclosed on the Casa Romantica. Hanson paid his $3 million debt by endowing the bank $12 million in mortgages.

The original property was five acres, but during the mid 20th century, 2.5 acres were sold.

Over the years, the house has been owned or operated by at least seven individuals or organizations, and has been renamed at least three times.

Transformation into a Cultural Center 

The San Clemente Historical Society, which has been instrumental in preserving many of San Clemente's original buildings, appealed to the City of San Clemente to purchase Casa Romantica and its 2.5 acres of gardens, and to register it as a historic landmark. Casa Romantica was purchased by the San Clemente Redevelopment Agency in 1989, and was listed on the National Register of Historic Places on December 27, 1991.

For the next several years, its proposed use was debated, but a city council vote in November 2001 determined that the landmark would be designated as a cultural center with a mixture of public and private funding. The vote was swayed by a $1.25M anonymous donation from the Orange County Community Foundation that earmarked the funds for use in a cultural arts or educational center. Following a $3.6M renovation, Casa Romantica Cultural Center and Gardens opened its doors to the public in 2003.

Current usage

Cultural Center
Today, Casa Romantica Cultural Center and Gardens provides programs for all ages in arts, music, history, horticulture and literature. As the epicenter of arts and culture in south Orange County, the cultural center produces over 60 concerts, workshops, classes, recitals, lectures, and events per year. Several of its programs have been critically acclaimed by the regional press, including its unique Classical Music Festival and Academy and its specially-commissioned rendition of the Shakespearean play Hamlet.

Casa Romantica is a member of the American Horticultural Society, admission to which enables free admission to a network of 300 gardens in the United States, Canada, the Cayman Islands, and the U.S. Virgin Islands. The 2.5 acres of gardens are an example of coastal landscaping that includes some of the original plantings made by Ole Hanson in 1927. Also included in the Garden is a display of Native American plants used by the Acjachmen Indians.

Casa Romantica is led by its Executive Director, Amy Behrens, and the President of the Board of Trustees, Ruth Denault.

Private events
Casa Romantica may be reserved for special events including weddings, photography and videography shoots, and other corporate or private events. It has been featured as a top Orange County destination in WeddingWire, Sunset magazine, The Knot, and AAA's Westways magazine.

References

External links

Casa Romantica Cultural Center and Gardens - official site
National Register of Historic Places: Orange County, California
San Clemente Historical Society

Buildings and structures in San Clemente, California
Houses on the National Register of Historic Places in California
National Register of Historic Places in Orange County, California
Tourist attractions in Orange County, California
Spanish Colonial Revival architecture in California
Gardens in California
Houses in Orange County, California